Café Continental is a British television variety show on the BBC Television Service from 1947 to 1953. Broadcast live from the BBC's studios at Alexandra Palace, the programme opened with a "Maître d'hôtel" known as Pere Auguste, who welcomed the television audience to the "cafe" set and told them that "your table has been reserved, as always."

Overview
Devised and produced by Henry Caldwell, Café Continental was broadcast on Saturday evenings at 8pm. Lasting for forty-five minutes, the episodes attracted many famous singers and dancers of the day: Josephine Baker appeared in an edition broadcast on 26 June 1948 and the Italian vocal group Quartetto Cetra appeared the same year.

Episode status
Three scattered episodes from 1950 are known to exist. Introduced by Helene Cordet.

References

Bibliography
Vahimagi, Tise. British Television: An Illustrated Guide. Oxford. Oxford University Press / British Film Institute. 1994. .

1947 British television series debuts
1953 British television series endings
1940s British television series
1950s British television series
BBC Television shows
Lost BBC episodes
Black-and-white British television shows
British variety television shows
English-language television shows